"Inside-Looking Out", often written "Inside Looking Out", is a 1966 single by the Animals, and their first for Decca Records. It was a moderate hit, reaching number 12 on the UK Singles Chart, number 23 in Canada, and number 34 in the United States on the U.S. pop singles chart.  
It was the group's final single with drummer John Steel, who left shortly after its release. He was replaced by Barry Jenkins, who would go on to play with Eric Burdon and the Animals.

Background
The song is very loosely based on a prison work chant entitled "Rosie," attributed to C. B. and Axe Gang, that was collected by musicologist Alan Lomax and released in his album Popular Songbook. As a result, the Animals' interpretation is credited to John and Alan Lomax with Eric Burdon and Chas Chandler.

Reception
Cash Box described the single as a "raunchy, pulsating blues-soaked plea in which a rejected fella begs his ex-girlfriend to return to him."

Chart performance

Cover versions
In 2001, Eric Burdon released a live cover on Official Live Bootleg 2000.
In 1969 it was covered by Grand Funk Railroad, who on their album Grand Funk added some marijuana references to the lyrics such as changing the original's "rebirth" to "reefer" and "canvas bags" to "nickel bags" ("burlap bags" in later reissues).  It was not only their sole UK Top 40 hit, but also a concert staple of the band for years and is included on their Live Album.
It was later covered by doom metal band the Obsessed, released on their 1999 compilation album Incarnate and again by the Greenhornes on their 2001 self-titled second album. 
Canadian guitarist Pat Travers also covered the song in 2003 on his album Power Trio.
Gerry Joe Weise
Shot on Site
the Mops
the Makers
the Rationals.

Influences and samples
A reworking of portions of the song was also recorded by the Austrian band Novak's Kapelle in 1969 as "Hypodermic Needle".  
Grand Funk's version is sampled in the songs "Sound of da Police" by KRS-One and "High 5 (Rock the Catskills)" by Beck.

References and notes

1966 songs
1966 singles
1969 singles
Songs written by Eric Burdon
The Animals songs
Grand Funk Railroad songs
Song recordings produced by Tom Wilson (record producer)
Decca Records singles
MGM Records singles
Songs about prison